The FNW Junior Heavyweight Championship was a professional wrestling title in Japanese promotion Fight Nation Wrestling (FNW), specifically for junior heavyweight (<100 kg) workers. In addition to United Kingdom, the title has also been defended in the Japan as part of a working relationship with Pro Wrestling Noah. Traditionally the "Junior Heavyweight" term is more common in Japanese professional wrestling while in the "Cruiserweight" is a term more used in the United States or Canada.

Tournament
IPW:UK held a one night 8-man tournament to crown the first champion. The event was held on January 15, 2019.

Title history

Combined reigns

See also
IPW:UK Tag Team Championship
IPW:UK Women's Championship
IPW:UK World Championship

References

External links
 IPW Junior Heavyweight Championship

International Pro Wrestling: United Kingdom championships
Junior heavyweight wrestling championships
Professional wrestling in the United Kingdom